This is a list of the prime ministers of the Papal States. Officially, the prime minister was recognized as the Minister of the Interior, as the title of "chief of the government" was reserved to the Cardinal Secretary of State. The office was created by the granting of the Statute of the Papal States in 1848 to 1850, when Pope Pius IX disclaimed the Statute after the Roman Republic's fall in 1849.

List of prime ministers (1847–1849)

Political parties

See also
List of popes

Papal States
Papal States,Prime Ministers
Prime Ministers